The International Pyrotechnics Society (IPS) is the professional society for the field of pyrotechnics. The IPS was officially founded in May 1980.

Introduction 
Apart from homogeneous Energetic Materials such as High Explosives and Propellants, those materials constituted from separate fuel and oxidizer particles are called pyrolants, or more commonly, Pyrotechnics. The International Pyrotechnics Society (IPS) offers membership to those who work with or have an interest in energetic materials especially pyrotechnics.

History 
In the 1960s some of these specialists attended meetings to share experiences, to present their work, their research and to meet new people. These meetings started as "the Colorado meetings", organized by the late Dr. Robert M. Blunt (1916-1995), and this later was formalized into what is currently known as the International Pyrotechnic Seminars.

The International Pyrotechnics Society  was officially formed in May 1980. However, The International Pyrotechnics Society can claim that its roots go back to 1968 when the First International Pyrotechnics Seminar was held at Estes Park Colorado, USA. It was the Steering Committee of the Sixth International Pyrotechnics Seminar who officially formed the International Pyrotechnics Society. The Society has continued to sanction International Pyrotechnics Seminars. These have normally been held in the United States every other year and other countries including Australia, China, France, Japan, Netherlands, New Zealand, Russia, Spain, Sweden and United Kingdom during the intervening years. Over the years, the membership of the Society has grown to approximately 275 people in 30 countries.

Purposes of this Society 
To promote and facilitate the exchange of information concerning the science and technology of energetic materials.
To create and maintain resources that can expedite members’ access to information about the science and technology of energetic materials.
To encourage research and education in the science and technology of energetic materials.
To sanction seminars on topics in the areas of energetic materials research, development, technology, and applications at such intervals that are appropriate for furthering the first purpose described above. To promote and facilitate the exchange of information concerning the science and technology of energetic materials, including propellants, explosives, and pyrotechnics, among all interested persons.

Seminars and Workshops 
The IPS sponsors or sanctions seminars on topics in the field of energetic materials research, development, technology and applications on an annual basis.
In even years, seminars are held in USA and in the uneven years, the seminars are held outside the USA. Meetings are sometimes jointly organized with similar organizations and institutes such as the French Association of Pyrotechnic. or Fraunhofer Institute for Chemical Technology (ICT).

Since 2004, a number of  workshops on the topic of Pyrotechnic Combustion have been held immediately prior to the International Pyrotechnic Seminars. These one day workshops that are organized independently of the main seminar have featured extended presentations by invited specialists on pyrotechnic combustion.

Promoting Young Scientists 
The IPS  aims to help young scientists to develop their career in this field of work. For each Seminar a bursary can be awarded to assist young pyrotechnicians to attend and present their work at International Seminars sponsored by the Society by contributing to their travel costs. The Bursary is known as the Frank Carver Bursary and is administrated by a Bursary Committee under the auspices of the Society.

Publication 
The official publication of the IPS is the Propellants, Explosives, Pyrotechnics journal published bimonthly by Wiley-VCH-publisher in Weinheim/Germany.

List of officials

References 

International professional associations
Organizations established in 1980